Alfonso Lorenzo  is an Argentinian football midfielder who played for Argentina in the 1934 FIFA World Cup. He also played for Barracas Central.

References

External links
FIFA profile

Argentine footballers
Argentina international footballers
Association football midfielders
1934 FIFA World Cup players
Year of birth missing